Cemal Azmi (1868 – April 17, 1922), also spelled Jemal Azmi, was an Ottoman politician and governor of the Trebizond (now Trabzon) Vilayet (province) during World War I and the final years of the Ottoman Empire. He was one of the perpetrators of the Armenian genocide and was mainly responsible for the liquidation of Armenians in Trebizond Vilayet. He was known as the "butcher of Trebizond".

Family
Cemal Azmi was born in Arapgir, Ottoman Empire, in 1868. His father, Osman Nuri Bey, was a title agent and his mother's name was Gülsüm. In 1891 he studied at the Mulkiye Mektep.

Role in the Armenian genocide
Azmi was one of the founders of the Teşkilât-ı Mahsusa (Special Organization). Many members of this organization eventually participated in the Turkish national movement and played special roles in the Armenian Genocide. Just prior to World War I, Azmi became the governor of Trebizond on July 7, 1914. During the Armenian Genocide in 1915, Azmi continued serving his duties as governor of the Trebizond Vilayet. Azmi favored conducting massacres outside of the city of Trebizond (now Trabzon). He was especially known for his persecution and violence towards Armenian children. Azmi, along with the collaboration of Nail Bey, ordered the drowning of thousands of women and children in the Black Sea.

Oscar S. Heizer, the American consul at Trebizond, reports: "This plan did not suit Nail Bey...Many of the children were loaded into boats and taken out to sea and thrown overboard". The Italian consul of Trebizond in 1915, Giacomo Gorrini, writes: "I saw thousands of innocent women and children placed on boats which were capsized in the Black Sea". The Trabzon trials also reported Armenians having been drowned in the Black Sea.

On April 12, 1919, during the 10th sitting of the Trabzon trials, it was testified by an eyewitness that Cemal Azmi turned a local hospital into a "pleasure dome" where he frequently had "sex orgies" with young Armenian girls. Hasan Maruf, a Turkish lieutenant and eyewitness to the scene said: "After committing the worst outrages the government officials involved had these young girls killed." While in Germany, Azmi disclosed to a local Armenian that he had young girls drowned at sea: "Among the most pretty Armenian girls, 10–13 years old, I selected a number of them and handed them over to my son as a gift; the others I had drowned in the sea." Azmi was also known for collecting girls up to the age of fifteen and boys up to the age of ten from orphanages and giving them to Muslim households.

Confiscation of Armenian assets 
In the aftermath of the Armenian genocide, the Azmi family acquired significant wealth through the confiscation of former Armenian-owned property and assets. Arusiag Kilijian, an 18-year-old orphan, who was a captive of Azmi's family, reported that Azmi's house was filled with "stolen goods, rugs, and so on".

It was also noted during the cross-examination of Nuri Bey during the 9th session of the trials at Trabzon on April 10, 1919, that Agent Mustafa, the commander of the seaport of Trabzon, "had taken a box belonging to Vartivar Muradian" and had received "five hundred pounds gold and jewels" from Cemal Azmi in exchange.

1919–1920 Military courts martial and Trabzon trials 
During the Turkish Courts-Martial of 1919–1920, Ottoman politician Çürüksulu Mahmud Pasha gave a speech in the Ottoman senate on December 2, 1919, where he openly blamed Cemal Azmi for the massacres in Trebizond and the subsequent drowning of thousands of women and children.

On December 11, 1918, Trebizond deputy governor Hafiz Mehmet testified in the Chamber of Deputies:

During the 14th session of the Trebizond trials on 26 April 1919, the governor of Giresun Arif Bey, asserted that Azmi gave him orders "to deport the Armenians toward Mosul by way of the Black Sea", which implied drowning them.

On May 22, 1919, as a result of the Trebizond trials, Cemal Azmi was sentenced to death under the charges of "murder and forced relocation".

Assassination and legacy
As part of Operation Nemesis for his role in the Armenian Genocide, Aram Yerganian and Arshavir Shirakian were later given the task to assassinate both Azmi and Bahattin Şakir who were in Berlin. Shirakian managed to kill only Azmi and wound Şakir. Yerganian immediately ran after Şakir and killed him with a shot to his head.

In 2003 an elementary school in Trabzon was named in honor of Cemal Azmi.

See also
Committee of Union and Progress
Operation Nemesis
Trabzon during the Armenian Genocide

References

External links

1868 births
1922 deaths
People convicted by the Ottoman Special Military Tribunal
Committee of Union and Progress politicians
Ottoman people of World War I
People from Arapgir
Young Turks
People sentenced to death in absentia
Assassinated people from the Ottoman Empire
People from the Ottoman Empire murdered abroad
People murdered in Berlin
Deaths by firearm in Germany
Armenian genocide perpetrators
People assassinated by Operation Nemesis
1920s murders in Berlin
1922 murders in Germany